Atrytonopsis deva, the deva skipper, is a species of grass skipper in the butterfly family Hesperiidae. It is found in Central America and North America.

The MONA or Hodges number for Atrytonopsis deva is 4081.

References

Further reading

 

Hesperiinae
Articles created by Qbugbot
Butterflies described in 1877